Jayden Nelson (born September 26, 2002) is a Canadian professional soccer player who plays as a winger for Rosenborg.

Early life 
Nelson grew up in Brampton, Ontario and began playing soccer at age four with Brampton YSC. He later joined the Toronto FC Academy at age 14.

Club career

Toronto FC
Nelson made his debut for Toronto FC III in League1 Ontario on September 2, 2017, in a game against Toronto Skillz FC in his only appearance of the season. The following season, he made seven appearances, scoring his first goal for Toronto FC III on June 17, 2018, against Windsor TFC.

Nelson made his professional debut for Toronto FC II in USL League One on April 6, 2019, coming on as a substitute against Orlando City B.

On January 23, 2020, Nelson signed a Homegrown Player contract with first-team Toronto FC. He made his MLS debut for Toronto during the MLS is Back tournament, starting their round of 16 match against New York City FC. He was loaned to the second team for some matches in 2021. He scored his first professional goal for Toronto FC II on June 16, 2021, against Fort Lauderdale CF.

In December 2021, after the conclusion of the 2021 MLS season, Nelson joined Belgian club Anderlecht for a training stint. He scored his first MLS goal on April 9, 2022, against Real Salt Lake.

Rosenborg
In February 2023, Toronto announced they had transferred Nelson to Eliteserien side Rosenborg.

International career

Youth 
Nelson attended his first Canadian youth camp in 2016. Nelson made his debut for the Canada national under-15 team in the 2017 CONCACAF Boys' Under-15 Championship on August 13, 2017, against the United States.

Nelson made his debut for the Canada national under-17 team in the 2019 CONCACAF Under-17 Championship on May 2, 2019, against the United States. Against Guatemala in the second game of the group stage, Nelson scored a hat-trick in a 4–2 win. Nelson scored twice more in the tournament – against Curaçao and Costa Rica respectively – as Canada qualified for the FIFA Under-17 World Cup for the first time since 2013. At the end of 2019, Nelson was named the Canadian Men's Youth International Player of the Year.

Nelson was named to the Canadian U-23 provisional roster for the 2020 CONCACAF Men's Olympic Qualifying Championship on February 26, 2020.

Senior
In January 2020, Nelson was called up to the Canadian senior team ahead of friendlies against Barbados and Iceland. He made his debut on January 7 against Barbados, coming on as a substitute in a 4–1 victory and scored his first goal three days later, also against Barbados.

Personal life 
Jayden was born in Canada and is of Jamaican descent. In 2022, Nelson made a donation to his former elementary school to restart a snack program which had been discontinued.

Career statistics

Club

International

International goals

Honours
Toronto FC
 Canadian Championship: 2020

Individual
 Canadian Youth International Player of the Year: 2019

References

External links 
 Toronto FC player profile
 

2002 births
Living people
Association football forwards
Canadian soccer players
Canadian people of Jamaican descent
Soccer players from Brampton
Toronto FC II players
Toronto FC players
League1 Ontario players
USL League One players
Canada men's youth international soccer players
Canada men's international soccer players
Homegrown Players (MLS)
Major League Soccer players